Agustín Calleri and Fernando González were the defending champions, but Gonzalez chose not to participate, and only Calleri competed that year.

Calleri partnered with Juan Martín del Potro, but they were forced to withdraw due to a gluteal strain for Calleri, before their first round match against Mark Knowles and Daniel Nestor.

Mark Knowles and Daniel Nestor won in the final 4–6, 6–4, [10–8], against Mariusz Fyrstenberg and Marcin Matkowski.

Seeds

Draw

Draw

External links
Draw

Doubles